Financial Supervisory Authority may refer to:

 Financial Supervisory Authority (Denmark)
 Financial Supervisory Authority (Iceland)
 Financial Supervision Authority (Poland)
 Financial Supervisory Authority (Sweden)
 Financial Supervisory Authority (Egypt)
 Financial Supervisory Authority of Norway

See also
 Federal Financial Supervisory Authority, Germany
 FSA (disambiguation)